Michael Carney (11 May 1839 – 2 February 1919) was a Canadian politician.

Born in Waterford, Ireland, Carney was educated at the Common School of Halifax, Nova Scotia. A merchant, he was first elected to the House of Commons of Canada for the electoral district of Halifax in the 1904 general elections. A Liberal, he was defeated in 1908.

References
 
 The Canadian Parliament; biographical sketches and photo-engravures of the senators and members of the House of Commons of Canada. Being the tenth Parliament, elected 3 November 1904

1839 births
1919 deaths
Irish emigrants to pre-Confederation Nova Scotia
Liberal Party of Canada MPs
Members of the House of Commons of Canada from Nova Scotia
People from Waterford (city)
People from Halifax, Nova Scotia